Nizhneivanayevo (Tübänge İvanay) is a rural locality (a village) and the administrative centre of Kuntugushevsky Selsoviet, Baltachevsky District, Bashkortostan, Russia. The population was 314 as of 2010. There are  5 streets.

Geography 
Nizhneivanayevo is located 9 km southeast of Starobaltachevo (the district's administrative centre) by road. Verkhneivanayevo is the nearest rural locality.

References 

Rural localities in Baltachevsky District